The Sale of Horses Act 1588 (31 Eliz 1 c 12) was an Act of the Parliament of England.

The whole Act was repealed by section 10(2) of, and Part I of Schedule 3 to, the Criminal Law Act 1967.

See also
The Sale of Horses Act 1555

References
Halsbury's Statutes,

Acts of the Parliament of England (1485–1603)
1588 in law
1588 in England
Horses in the United Kingdom